Sergiu Sebastian Mândrean (born 18 October 1978) is a Romanian former professional football player who played as a right back for teams such as Gloria Bistrița, Pandurii Târgu Jiu, Gloria Buzău, FC Bistrița or ACS Dumitra, among others.

External links
 
 Sergiu Mândrean at frf-ajf.ro

1978 births
People from Luduș
Living people
Romanian footballers
Association football defenders
Liga I players
Liga II players
Liga III players
ACF Gloria Bistrița players
CS Pandurii Târgu Jiu players
FC Gloria Buzău players
Romanian football managers